Josh Olson (born July 13, 1981) is an American former professional ice hockey player who played five National Hockey League (NHL) games with the Florida Panthers during the 2003–04 season. He was drafted by the Panthers in the sixth round, 190th overall, at the 2000 NHL Entry Draft. Olson moved with his family to Roseau, Minnesota when he was nine years old and he grew up playing hockey for Roseau High School.

Career statistics

References

External links

1981 births
Living people
American men's ice hockey left wingers
Bolzano HC players
Fargo-Moorhead Ice Sharks players
Florida Panthers draft picks
Florida Panthers players
Hannover Indians players
Hershey Bears players
Houston Aeros (1994–2013) players
Jackson Bandits players
Omaha Lancers players
Sportspeople from Fargo, North Dakota
Portland Winterhawks players
San Antonio Rampage players
Ritten Sport players
Utah Grizzlies (AHL) players
Ice hockey people from North Dakota